Tobias Schweinsteiger (born 12 March 1982) is a retired German footballer, who is the head coach of VfL Osnabrück. As player he was deployed as a midfielder or forward. He is the older brother of former German international Bastian Schweinsteiger.

Career

Early career
Schweinsteiger played youth football for FV Oberaudorf (two spells), his hometown club TSV 1860 Rosenheim, Austrian side FC Kufstein and SpVgg Unterhaching before being released in 2001. He joined Bavarian amateur sides SV Nußdorf and Falke Markt Schwaben and spent eighteen months playing for SSV Jahn Regensburg's reserve team before joining FC Ismaning in 2004. After an impressive half-season with Ismaning, he signed for VfB Lübeck of the Regionalliga Nord just after the beginning of the 2004–05 season.

Northern Germany
Schweinsteiger made an immediate impact for Lübeck, scoring within one minute of coming on as a substitute on his debut to secure a 1–0 victory over rivals Holstein Kiel. He formed an effective strike partnership with Lars Kampf, with the pair scoring eleven goals each as the club narrowly missed out on promotion to the 2. Bundesliga, finishing in third place. In the summer of 2005, Lübeck signed forwards Kai Hesse and Enrico Neitzel, and this increased competition meant that Schweinsteiger was often used as a substitute, but still managed to score seven goals. Lübeck experienced a repeat of last season's league position, finishing third again, although Schweinsteiger was to ascend to the second division, signing for Eintracht Braunschweig in July 2006.

He made his 2. Bundesliga debut on the fifth matchday of the season, coming on as a substitute for Torsten Lieberknecht in a 2–2 draw with Karlsruher SC. In his next game, three weeks later, he scored two late goals to secure a 2–0 win over 1860 Munich. This proved to be one of only three wins for Braunschweig as they were relegated from the second tier, finishing in last place, by which point Schweinsteiger had found himself less in favour, restricted to mostly substitute appearances in the second half of the season.

After just a year with Braunschweig, Schweinsteiger returned to VfB Lübeck, but this time lasted only six months—he was part of a large exodus in January 2008, after a poor start to the season made it clear that they wouldn't be able to qualify for the new 3. Liga. He returned to SpVgg Unterhaching, for whom he'd played as a youth, and who were now playing in the Regionalliga Süd.

Return to Bavaria
Schweinsteiger made his Unterhaching debut in a local derby against Bayern Munich II, coming on as a substitute for Thomas Rathgeber and scoring the second goal in a 4–2 win. He ended the season with five goals in thirteen appearances for the club, as they finished sixth to qualify for the inaugural 3. Liga season. He played in Haching's first game at this level, as a substitute for Anton Fink in a 3–0 win over Werder Bremen II, but this was to typify his 2008–09 season: most of his 34 appearances were as a late substitute and as such he only managed three goals has the club narrowly missed out on promotion, finishing 4th. The following season he was a regular starter, and finished as the club's top scorer with fourteen goals, despite the club finishing in a fairly disappointing 11th place.

Unterhaching were forced to cut costs, and Schweinsteiger was one of a number of senior players to leave, joining another of his former clubs, Jahn Regensburg. He had two successful seasons with Regensburg, finishing as top scorer on both occasions with nine and fourteen goals respectively. In the latter season he was club captain as Regensburg finished third, and won promotion to the 2. Bundesliga with a play-off victory over Karlsruher SC.

FC Bayern
Schweinsteiger was to drop down to the fourth tier, though, to join Bayern Munich II of the Regionalliga Bayern,  where his brother, Bastian played for the first team. Along with Stefan Buck and Altin Lala, Tobias was one of three experienced players brought in by coach Mehmet Scholl to help the young team in their bid to earn promotion to the 3. Liga. After a disappointing first half of the 2012–13 season, he returned to SpVgg Unterhaching on a six-month loan in January 2013, as a replacement for the outgoing Florian Niederlechner. Meanwhile, Bayern II finished in second place, missing out on promotion and Schweinsteiger returned to the team for the 2013–14 season. He scored fourteen goals as Bayern II won the division, but missed promotion after losing on away goals to Fortuna Köln in the playoff. Although he was injured for a longer time in the following season, he managed to score seven goals in 22 appearances. It became his last season as an active footballer, since the club told him early on that his expiring contract would not be extended anymore.

Managerial career
Schweinsteiger started his coaching career right after his retirement from professional football. In July 2015, Schweinsteiger was hired as an assistant manager of Bayern Munich under-17 team. Schweinsteiger spent two seasons as the assistant manager of the U17 team. In July 2017, Schweinsteiger was promoted as the assistant manager for the Bayern Munich II team. On 9 July 2018, Schweinsteiger was released as the assistant manager of the Bayern Munich II team as Tim Walter left his job as the manager of the Bayern Munich II team. Walter was appointed as the manager of Holstein Kiel and instead of promoting Schweinsteiger to manager, the club appointed Holger Seitz as the new manager of Bayern Munich II. Seitz brought his own assistant manager with him.

Schweinsteiger then became the coach of FC Juniors OÖ. This was announced at the end of December 2018. In August 2022, he was appointed as the head coach of VfL Osnabrück.

Career statistics
as of 1 July 2015

Personal life
In 2006, Schweinsteiger was involved in a car accident that left a 13-year-old girl dead. Police investigation revealed that Schweinsteiger was blameless for the fatal accident.

References

External links

1982 births
Living people
People from Rosenheim
Sportspeople from Upper Bavaria
German footballers
Footballers from Bavaria
Association football midfielders
2. Bundesliga players
3. Liga players
Regionalliga players
Oberliga (football) players
VfB Lübeck players
Eintracht Braunschweig players
SpVgg Unterhaching players
SSV Jahn Regensburg players
FC Bayern Munich II players
SSV Jahn Regensburg II players
FC Bayern Munich non-playing staff
Hamburger SV non-playing staff
VfL Osnabrück managers
3. Liga managers